Listing for films produced by the motion picture divisions of CBS (a subsidiary of Paramount Global), includes Cinema Center Films, CBS Theatrical Films and CBS Films.

Currently the rights to all of these films are owned by Paramount Pictures (through Viacom's acquisition of CBS in 1999), the CCF and CTF films are distributed by Paramount Home Entertainment in the home media market. As for CBS Films, Sony Pictures Worldwide Acquisitions has the U.S. home entertainment distribution rights and the foreign theatrical and home entertainment distribution rights for all pre-2015 films, while Lionsgate owns the distribution rights for the 2015–2019 releases. Paramount will assume distribution rights when their respective deals expire. As for TV rights for these libraries, they are owned by CBS Media Ventures, with the pay cable rights for CBS Films going though sister company Showtime Networks.

Cinema Center Films 
 Hail, Hero! (1969) Halcyon Productions
 The April Fools (May 28, 1969) Jalem Productions, Inc.
 Me, Natalie (July 13, 1969) Nob Hill Productions
 With Six You Get Eggroll (September 1968) Arwin Productions, Inc.
 The Reivers (December 25, 1969) Duo Productions, Solar Productions, Inc.
 The Royal Hunt of the Sun (1969)
 A Boy Named Charlie Brown (December 4, 1969) United Feature Syndicate
 Darker than Amber (August 14, 1970)
 Homer (September 1970) Palomar Pictures
 The Boys in the Band (1970)
 Little Big Man (1970)
 Something for Everyone (1970) Media Productions
 A Man Called Horse (April 29, 1970) Sandy Howard Productions Corp.
 Scrooge (November 1970) National General Pictures
 Big Jake western (June 1971) Batjac Productions, Inc.
 Rio Lobo Western (December 16, 1970) Malabar Productions
 Le Mans (June 1971) Solar Productions
 Blue Water, White Death documentary (June 1971) Blue Water Film Corporation Productions
 Who Is Harry Kellerman and Why Is He Saying Those Terrible Things About Me? (June 15, 1971)
 Figures in a Landscape (July 1971) Cinecrest Film Ltd.
 The African Elephant documentary (October 1971) Dartmouth Productions
 Something Big (November 1971) Stanmore Productions, Inc., Penbar Productions, Inc.
 The Christian Licorice Store (December 1971)
 Come to Your Senses (December 1971) Prana-Mendelson Productions
 The War Between Men and Women (May 1972)  Jalem Productions, Inc., Lienroc Productions
 The Little Ark (March 1972) Robert B. Radnitz Productions Ltd.
 Prime Cut (June 1972) Wizan Productions
 The Revengers (June 1972)
 Snoopy, Come Home (August 1972)  Lee Mendelson Film Productions, Inc., Bill Melendez Productions 
 Cutting Loose – unreleased documentary

Unmade projects 
The following projects were announced but not made:
 The Apollo of Bellac (1967), based on the play by Jean Giradou
 Contrast (circa 1967), based on two short stories by W. Somerset Maugham
 Nelly Bly (circa 1967), a biopic of the famous reporter
 musical adaptation of Treasure Island by Elliot Kastner and Jerry Gershwin
 Yucatán (1971), a motorcycle adventure starring Steve McQueen
 Man on a Nylon String (1971), an adventure tale to be made by Solar Productions but not starring Steve McQueen set in the Alps
 Applegate's Gold (circa 1971), a Western for Solar Productions

CBS Theatrical Films

Cancelled film 
Starblasters was to be a video game-themed movie, due to be released about Christmas time 1982, at least some of the film was to be computer-animated. It would have been the second video game-themed movie after Tron which was released in July of that year.

CBS Films

References 

Films
Lists of films by studio
Lists of Paramount Pictures films